Carlos Serantes Saavedra (1905 – 31 March 1950) was a sailor from Argentina, who represented his country at the 1928 Summer Olympics in Amsterdam, Netherlands. He also competed in the men's eight event at the 1924 Summer Olympics.

References

External links
 

1905 births
1950 deaths
Argentine male sailors (sport)
Sailors at the 1928 Summer Olympics – 8 Metre
Olympic sailors of Argentina
Argentine male rowers
Olympic rowers of Argentina
Rowers at the 1924 Summer Olympics